The Chairman of Committees was an elected position of the New Zealand Legislative Council. The role was established in 1865 and existed until the abolition of the Legislative Council. The roles of the Chairman of Committees were to deputise for the Speaker, and to chair the House when it was in committee.  The role of Chairman of Committees also existed for the House of Representatives.

Appointment
Initially, the Legislative Council elected its Chairman of Committees at the beginning of each parliamentary session, with the Legislative Council and the House of Representatives meeting at the same time. The Standing Orders were adjusted in 1928, providing for a three-year tenure in alignment with the electoral cycle of the House of Representatives.

Office holders
The following is a list of Chairmen of Committees of the Legislative Council:

Key

†: died in office

Notes

References

Constitution of New Zealand
Speakers of the New Zealand Legislative Council